Jane C. Beck (born 1941) is an American folklorist and oral historian.  She is Executive Director Emeritus and founder of the Vermont Folklife Center and has published research on the folklore of Vermont and on African American belief systems.

Early life and education 
Jane (née Choate) Beck grew up in Long Island, New York. Her father, Thomas Hyde Choate, worked as an investment banker. Her mother, Jane Harte Choate was involved with a number of charitable organizations.

Beck attended St. Timothy's School in Maryland and then Middlebury College, Vermont. At Middlebury College, she read American Literature and met her future husband, Professor Horace Beck. She graduated from Middlebury College in 1963 and undertook graduate studies in folklore at the University of Pennsylvania. She married Horace in 1965.  She completed her Ph.D. in 1969 with a thesis entitled 'Ghostlore of the British Isles and Ireland'.

Career 
Beck began work as state folklorist for Vermont in 1978. The role was created through the Vermont Council on the Arts.

Beck founded the Vermont Folklife Center as a private non-profit organization in 1983. She served as its executive director until 2007.

After retirement, Beck published Daisy Turner's Kin: An African American Family Saga (2015).  Daisy Turner was the daughter of freed African American slaves and the book relates four generations of oral history from her family.  It was based on interviews Beck carried out with Turner, beginning in 1983 when Turner was 100 years old. Beck traveled to Virginia, West Africa, and England to research the family history of Turner for the book.

Recognition 
Beck served as president of the American Folklore Society (AFS) between 1995 and 1996. Her Presidential address was titled 'Talking Stock' and reflected on her 35 years as a member of the AFS.  It drew on interviews with 100 fellow members of the Society.

She received the Lifetime Achievement Award from the Center for Vermont Research at the University of Vermont in 2011.

In 2016, Daisy Turner's Kin: An African American Family Saga was awarded both the Wayland D. Hand Prize (by the History and Folklore Section) and the Chicago Folklore Prize (as "best book of folklore scholarship for the year") by the  American Folklore Society.

Selected publications 
 Beck, Jane C. (1970). "The White Lady of Great Britain and Ireland". Folklore. 81 (4): 292–306. .
 Beck, Jane C. (1972). "The Giant Beaver: A Prehistoric Memory?". Ethnohistory. 19 (2): 109–122. . .
 Beck, Jane C. (1973). "'Dream Messages' from the Dead". Journal of the Folklore Institute. 10 (3): 173–186. . .
 Beck, Jane C. (1975). "The West Indian Supernatural World: Belief Integration in a Pluralistic Society". The Journal of American Folklore. 88 (349): 235–244. . .
 Beck, Jane C. (1976). "The Implied Obeah Man". Western Folklore. 35 (1): 23–33. . .
 Beck, Jane C (1979). To Windward of the Land: The Occult World of Alexander Charles. Bloomington; London: Indiana Univ. Pr. .
 Beck, Jane C (1982). Always in Season: Folk Art and Traditional Culture in Vermont. Montpelier, Vt.: Vermont Council on the Arts. . .
 Beck, Jane C (1995). Vermont recollections: sifting memories through the interview process. Orono: Maine Folklife Center. . .
 Beck, Jane C (1985). Legacy of the Lake: A Study Guide to Folklore of the Lake Champlain Region. Montpelier, Vt.: Vermont Folklife Center.
 Beck, Jane C (1988). The General Store in Vermont: An Oral History. Middlebury, Vt.: Vermont Folklife Center. .
 Beck, Jane C. (1997). "Taking Stock: 1996 American Folklore Society Presidential Address". The Journal of American Folklore. 110 (436): 123–139. . .
 Beck, Jane C. (2015). Daisy Turner's Kin: An African American Family Saga. Urbana. . .
 Gerzina, Gretchen; Beck, Jane C.; Kolovos, Andy; Chambliss, Julian C.; Veitch, Ezra; Bennett, Marek. (2021). Turner family stories : from enslavement in Virginia to freedom in Vermont. Middlebury, VT. . .

References

External links 
 Jane C. Beck speaking on the PBS network show 'Profile', 24 January 2005.
 Jane C. Beck speaking on the PBS network show 'Connect' about Daisy Turner's kin, 15 October 2015.

Living people
1941 births
American folklorists
Women folklorists
Middlebury College alumni
University of Pennsylvania School of Arts and Sciences alumni
Presidents of the American Folklore Society
Academics from Vermont
Academics from New York (state)